Paul Matisse (born 1933) is an artist and inventor known for his public art installations, many of which are interactive and produce sound. Matisse also invented the Kalliroscope.

Early life and education

Paul Matisse is the son of New York gallery owner Pierre Matisse, (the youngest son of painter Henri Matisse), and Alexina Sattler. His mother later divorced Pierre and married artist Marcel Duchamp, becoming Alexina "Teeny" Duchamp. Thus Paul is both grandson of Henri Matisse, and the stepson of Marcel Duchamp. 

In 1954, Matisse graduated from Harvard University, where he  joined a long line of esteemed alumni who had lived in Eliot House while at Harvard. Matisse studied at Harvard's Graduate School of Design, and worked briefly with Buckminster Fuller.

Artistic career

Matisse worked in product development for Arthur D. Little. In 1962 he set off on his own, inventing (1966), patenting (1968), and ultimately manufacturing Kalliroscopes, which can display the complex and otherwise-invisible flow of liquids. 

After the death of his stepfather Marcel Duchamp in 1968, Matisse worked with his widowed mother Alexina "Teeny" Duchamp and curator Anne d'Harnoncourt to implement the posthumous installation of Duchamp's artwork Étant donnés at the Philadelphia Museum of Art.

Personal life
Matisse currently resides in a former Baptist church in Groton, Massachusetts. His daughter Sophie Matisse is an artist in New York City. His son, Alex Matisse, is a pottery artist and founder of East Fork Pottery in North Carolina. His granddaughter is actress Gaïa Jacquet-Matisse.

Selected public artworks

Meditation Bell (2012) - exhibited at Chateau la Coste in 2018
Olympic Bell (2004) - installation for the Athens Olympic Games
Charlestown Bells (2000) – interactive musical sculpture on the Charles River Dam between downtown Boston and the Boston neighborhood of Charlestown
Memorial Bell (2001) – at the National Japanese-American Memorial to Patriotism in Washington, DC
Forest Bells (1997)] – six vertical aluminum bells hanging from the limbs of oak trees on Groton Conservation Trust property in Groton, Massachusetts
Kendall Band (1987) – interactive musical sculpture in the MBTA's Kendall/MIT subway station in Cambridge, Massachusetts
Musical Fence (1980) – interactive musical sculpture once located in Cambridge, Massachusetts, and now installed at the DeCordova Museum in Lincoln, Massachusetts. Another version is at the Montshire Museum of Science in Vermont. 
Untitled (1976) - Alexander Calder's last major artwork, posthumously modified for installation by Paul Matisse

References

External links
Artist's personal website

1933 births
Living people
American artists
American people of French descent
Harvard University alumni
Henri Matisse
Paul
People from Groton, Massachusetts